Ammayi Pelli is a 1974 Indian Telugu-language comedy film, produced and directed by Bhanumathi Ramakrishna under the Bharani Pictures banner. It stars Bhanumathi and N. T. Rama Rao, with music also composed by Bhanumathi Ramakrishna in association with Satyam.

Plot
Advocate Raghuram (N. T. Rama Rao) and Dr. Lalitha (Bhanumathi Ramakrishna) are an ideal couple, they lead a happy family life with their three children. The couple is being in the process of making their daughter Padmini / Puppy (Latha)'s marriage, they see two different matches without informing each other, i.e. their juniors Lawyer Sitaram (Padmanabham) and Dr. Rajaram (Srikanth). But Puppy is already in love with a young guy, Ravi (Chandra Mohan). Here, a dispute arrives between the couple and the egos clash which lead to their divorce. Then Raghuram's friend Raghava Rao (Gummadi) gives a suggestion to live separately for 2 months by keeping the children with each of them per month. The rest of the story is a comic tale, that parents are seeing to combine their juniors with their daughter and children are trying to reunite their parents. Finally, the movie ends on a happy note with the marriage of Ravi & Puppy.

Cast
Bhanumathi Ramakrishna as Dr. Lalitha
N. T. Rama Rao as Advocate Raghuram
Gummadi as Raghava Rao 
Chandra Mohan as Ravi 
Latha as Padmini / Puppy 
Padmanabham as Seetaram 
Dhulipala
Dr. Sivaramakrishnaiah  
Raavi Kondala Rao 
Mada
Srikanth as Dr. Rajaram 
Chaya Devi
Radha Kumari 
Pushpa Kumari
Master Ramesh as Gopi
Master Sekhar as Pappu

Soundtrack

Music composed by Bhanumathi Ramakrishna & Satyam.

References

Indian comedy-drama films
Films scored by Satyam (composer)
1974 comedy-drama films
1974 films